Bhangel is a semi-urban neighborhood in Noida, in Gautam Buddh Nagar district of the Indian state of Uttar Pradesh.

Cities and towns in Gautam Buddh Nagar district
Neighbourhoods in Noida